Sister Francella Mary Griggs, S.N.J.M., (February 5, 1920 – January 7, 2012) was a Native American member of the Sisters of the Holy Names of Jesus and Mary and a leading advocate of the Confederated Tribes of Siletz Indians of Oregon. She successfully advocated for the restoration of federal recognition of the Confederated Tribes of Siletz Indians. The tribe regained federal recognition in 1977.

Sister Francella was born Florence Griggs on February 5, 1920, to Lloyd Manley and Amanda West Griggs. She graduated from St. Mary School in Medford, Oregon. The oldest of two sisters, Grigg's parents both died when she was young. She and her sister were raised at the Christie School, as the school is now called, in Marylhurst, Oregon, by the Sisters of the Holy Names of Jesus and Mary.

Griggs entered the Sisters of the Holy Names of Jesus and Mary and took her vows on February 5, 1943, which was her 23rd birthday. She completed bachelor's degrees in English and Spanish. Sister Francella then taught at high schools throughout the Pacific Northwest, including Holy Names Academy in Seattle, Holy Names Academy in Spokane, Sacred Heart Academy in Salem, Oregon, St. Mary's High School in Eugene, Oregon, Star of the Sea in Astoria, Oregon, and St. Mary's Academy in Portland, Oregon.

Griggs began focusing on Native American issues beginning in the late 1960s. She joined a commission to restore federal recognition of the Confederated Tribes of Siletz Indians, which she and her family were members. She collaborated with several Oregon United States representatives for federal recognition, which was restored in 1977. She became a professor at the Indian Center of Eastern Oregon State College, now known Eastern Oregon University, in La Grande, Oregon. She also served as the executive director of the Portland Urban Indian Program.

Griggs died on January 7, 2012, at the Marie-Rose Center at Mary's Woods in Lake Oswego, Oregon, at the age of 91. She was the oldest member of the Confederated Tribes of Siletz Indians at the time. Her Mass of Christian Burial was held at the Mary’s Woods Provincial House Chapel in Lake Oswego and she was buried in a family plot on the Siletz Indian reservation.

References

1920 births
2012 deaths
People from Clackamas County, Oregon
20th-century American Roman Catholic nuns
Confederated Tribes of Siletz Indians
Sisters of the Holy Names of Jesus and Mary
Native American activists
Eastern Oregon University faculty
Native American history of Oregon
Burials in Oregon
Catholics from Oregon
American women academics
21st-century American Roman Catholic nuns
20th-century Native American women
20th-century Native Americans
21st-century Native American women
21st-century Native Americans
Native American people from Oregon